Shanesia Davis-Williams (also Shanesia Davis, Shanésia Davis, and Shane Williams; born September 30, 1966) is an American actress who co-starred as Marissa Clark on the television series Early Edition.

Personal life
Born in Detroit, Michigan on September 30, 1966, Shanesia Davis-Williams was living in Chicago.

Career
Davis-Williams has acted in film, stage, and television.  In March 2019, she was best known as Marissa Clark, the co-starring role she played in the CBS TV series Early Edition.  , Davis taught theatre at The Theatre School at DePaul University and the University of Illinois Chicago.

Performance credits

References

External links
 

1966 births
20th-century American actresses
21st-century American actresses
Actresses from Detroit
American film actresses
American stage actresses
American television actresses
Living people